Melathikkan is a township in Tiruvannamalai Taluk in Tiruvannamalai District in Tamil Nadu State. Melathikkan is 2.6 km far from its Taluk Main Town Tiruvannamalai. Melathikkan is located 2.9 km distance from its District Main City Tiruvannamalai. It is located 158 km distance from its State Main City Chennai.

Nearby towns and panchayats with distance are Tiruvannamalai (2.9 km), Thenmathur (3.3 km), So.Kilnachipattu (3.4 km), Chinnakangiyanur (3.8 km), Nallavanpalayam (4.3 km). Towns nearby Tiruvannamalai (2.6 km), Thandrampet (15.3 km), Thurinjapuram (19.9 km), Keelpennathur (21.8 km).

Demographics
Melathikkan having population of over 5000 providing sub urban to Tiruvannamalai urbanity. It comes under Tiruvannamalai urban agglomerations on tirukovilur road (chitoor- Cudllore road) NH 234A. there is one railway station for Melathikkan as "MELATHIKKAN - SARON " at tirukovilur railway route.

References

External links

Cities and towns in Tiruvannamalai district